Dennett is a surname that may refer to:
 Daniel Dennett (1942), is an American philosopher, writer, and cognitive scientist.
 Fred A. Dennett (1849–1920), American politician
 Edward George Dennett (1879–1937), Gloucestershire cricketer, one of the best bowlers never to play Test cricket
 Lydia Neal Dennett (1798-1881), American abolitionist and suffragist
 Mary Dennett (1872–1947), American birth control activist
 R. E. Dennett, English trader, wrote a number of books that were influential on sociological and anthropological research on the cultures of West Africa.
Russell Dennett, British musician (The Human League)
Tyler Dennett (1883–1949), American historian, won the 1934 Pulitzer Prize for Biography or Autobiography.